Hamilton North and East is one of the 20 electoral wards of South Lanarkshire Council. Created in 2007, the ward elects three councillors using the single transferable vote electoral system and covers an area with a population of 15,004 people.

The ward was previously a Labour stronghold with the party holding two of the three seats between 2007 and 2017. However, it has since become split between Labour, the Scottish National Party (SNP) and the Conservatives with each party holding one seat since 2017.

Boundaries
The ward was created following the Fourth Statutory Reviews of Electoral Arrangements ahead of the 2007 Scottish local elections. As a result of the Local Governance (Scotland) Act 2004, local elections in Scotland would use the single transferable vote electoral system from 2007 onwards so Hamilton North and East was formed from an amalgamation of several previous first-past-the-post wards. It contained all of the former Whitehill ward, the majority of the former Hamilton Centre/Ferniegair ward and part of the former Burnbank/Blantyre and Hamilton Centre North wards as well as a small part of the former Udston and Wellhall/Earnock ward. Hamilton North and East covers the northern and eastern parts of Hamilton including the town centre, Barncluith, Burnbank, Chantinghall, Hamilton West and Whitehill, plus the separate village of Ferniegair/Allanton. The River Clyde forms the ward's eastern boundary, coinciding with the council's border with North Lanarkshire Council, and the Avon Water forms the ward's southwestern boundary. Following the Fifth Statutory Reviews of Electoral Arrangements ahead of the 2017 Scottish local elections, streets south of the town centre between Portland Place, Burnblea Street and Kemp Street were transferred to Hamilton South while streets around Ballantrae Road were transferred into the ward from Blantyre.

Councillors

Election results

2022 election

2017 election

2016 by-election

2012 election

2007 election

Notes

References

Wards of South Lanarkshire
Hamilton, South Lanarkshire